Freycinetia auriculata is a species of plant in the family Pandanaceae. It is endemic to the Philippines.

References

auriculata
Flora of the Philippines
Vulnerable plants
Taxonomy articles created by Polbot